Structural competency is a term used in American health professional education to describe the ability of health care providers and trainees to appreciate how symptoms, clinical problems, diseases and attitudes toward patients, populations and health systems are influenced by 'upstream' social determinants of health.

The creators of this term Jonathan Metzl and Helena Hansen proposed a 5-point model .
 Recognition of "structures that shape clinical interactions"
 Development of "an extraclinical language of structure"
 Rearticulation of "'cultural' presentations in structural terms"
 Observation and imagination of "structural intervention"
 Development of "structural humility"

The concept of structural competency is framed in the language of competency based medical education and is proposed as a new iteration of cultural competency which is a defined competency in American medical, nursing and public health education.

References 
Jonathan M. Metzl and Helena Hansen (2014) Structural competency: Theorizing a new medical engagement with stigma and inequality, Social Science & Medicine, Volume 103, Pages 126-133 

What Is Competency-Based Medical Education? 

Cultural Competence Education for Students in Medicine and Public Health - Report of an AAMC and AAPH Expert Panel

External links 
 www.structuralcompetency.org
 Nashville Post - The Case For Structural Competency

Medical education in the United States